ETR 500 (Elettro Treno Rapido 500) is a family of Italian high-speed trains built by AnsaldoBreda and introduced in 1993.

Designed under the aegis of the Ferrovie dello Stato (FS), it is now operated by Trenitalia on RFI tracks.

History

The opening of the Direttissima line, connecting Florence with Rome, in stages between 1978 and 1991 was the first high speed line in Europe. Then, in the 1990s, FS unveiled plans to build a whole new high speed network.

The new train was to be built by the TREVI (TREno Veloce Italiano, "Italian Fast Train") consortium,  formed by Breda Costuzioni Ferroviarie, FIAT Ferroviaria, Tecnomasio and Firema Trasporti.

Prototypes
In 1988 the first prototype motorcar, called ETR 500-X and nicknamed "Remo," as the brother of the first Roman king, rolled out of the factory in Vado Ligure.

In 1990 the 2 first complete trainsets, called ETR 500-Y and nicknamed "Romolo," as the first Roman king, were delivered. They were used as test units between their delivery and 1995, when the first production sets entered into service. Between 1995 and 1997 they were also used in normal commercial service when there was a shortage of normal ETR.500 trainsets.

The 3 motorcars of the prototype sets are now based at different locations in Italy and unfortunately have been vandalised and graffitized. The middle cars of the 2 ETR 500-Y sets are now part of the two RFI ETR.500 test trains Y1 and Y2.

First generation

After the success of the 2 prototypes, FS decided to order 30 mono-current trainsets supporting the 3 kV DC supply of existing lines. Delivered between 1992 and 1996, with interiors styled by design company Pininfarina, they consist of 2 motorcars (numbered E 404 100 to 159), four first class cars, a restaurant car, and six second class cars. This was also the reason why a second generation, dual-voltage trains was ordered.

Major routes of this train were Chiusi-Milan, Florence-Naples, Milan-Rome Termini, Milan-Naples, Bologna-Rome Termini, Milan-Salerno, Milan-Venice, Venice-Rome Termini.

Between 2006 and 2008, the first generation trains have been upgraded with newly built E.404 6xx dual-voltage motorcars, coupled to the existing middle cars. All E.404 0xx motorcars of the older trainsets have been refurbished and transformed into locomotives of the type E.414, to haul EuroStarCity and later Frecciabianca trains on selected routes. These trains consist of two E.414 locomotives and 10 former Intercity UIC-Z coaches. Although the coaches are "normal" Intercity coaches, they will mostly remain in semi-permanent coupled formation with the two E.414 locomotives.

Second generation

With the new high-speed lines finally in construction, FS chose to electrify the lines at  instead of  3 kV DC as used on the classic network. As the first generation trains can not operate off 25 kV AC, new trains had to be ordered. As the new trains can run both off 25 kV AC and 3 kV DC, they were designated P for politensione (multi-voltage).

The new power cars of the trains feature a totally different design than the first generation trainsets, although also designed by design company Pininfarina. These new trains, delivered between 2000 and 2005, consist in original formation of 2 motorcars, four 1st class cars, a restaurant car, and six 2nd class cars. However, with the addition of a Business class car after the four 1st class cars to all trainsets, expansion to 12 middle cars was finished in 2004.

The second generation trains can be divided in multiple sub-series. They were delivered in three batches:
 ETR 500 P ord. '96 (sets 31-60 with power cars numbered E.404 500-559): trainset built as new.
 ETR 500 P ord. '02 (sets 1-30 with power cars numbered E.404 600-659): power cars built as new for use with cars from the 1st generation (mono-current) trainsets.
 power cars E.404 660-663: an extension of the second batch, to replace four power cars sold to infrastructure authority RFI (see below), delivered in 2007-8.

In addition, there are rebuilt and refurbished versions:
 ETR 500 F: trainsets modified for operation in France (F for Francia = France). This version was tri-current, as it was also enabled for the 1.5 kV DC system used on conventional lines in Southern France. These sets had only 8 middle cars: three 1st class cars, a restaurant car, and four 2nd class cars. Multiple trains, including sets 39, 54, 58 and 60 were converted and used for tests in France from 2001 to 2005 on the LGV Nord line. However, no type approval was granted for the trains in France even after the tests, the trains never entered regular cross-border service. Both the middle and power cars were rebuilt as standard P units in 2006-7.
 ETR 500 Y1 (with power cars numbered E.404 649, 652) and Y2 (with power cars numbered E.404 648, 621): test trains for infrastructure authority RFI, with new tractor heads attached to the old middle cars of the original Y500 prototypes. Used for the commissioning of new high-speed lines. Y1 has 8 middle cars, Y2 has 3 at present.
 ETR 500 P 8-car sets for Turin-Milan: When the Turin-Novara high-speed line was opened in 2006, Turin-Milan service started with ETR 500 P units reduced to 8 middle cars, to fit the length of the station platforms at Malpensa Airport. These trains included set 60 (part of a former ETR 500 F set) in special 2006 Winter Olympics livery.
 ETR 500 "AV": in 2005, Trenitalia introduced a new service concept for its high-speed trainsets, under the new brand name AV (for Alta Velocità = High Speed) in addition to Eurostar Italia. In the course of this, all ETR 500 trainsets received new interior and a new livery, with the "AV" logo prominently displayed on the power cars.
 ETR 500 "Frecciarossa": in 2008, Trenitalia introduced new brand names for its Eurostar Italia Alta Velocità high-speed trains that categorise them according to top speed. The new brand name for trains with top speeds in the  range is Frecciarossa (meaning Red Arrow). The ETR 500 and the new ETR 1000 are currently the only trains qualifying as Frecciarossa. The trains receive a new livery with a red stripe and the brand name on the power cars.

Speed records

 ETR 500 P set 31, shortened to 8 middle cars, achieved  on the Rome-Naples line on 7 September 2005.
 ETR 500 P set 31 achieved  (on 5 October 2005) and then ETR 500 Y2 achieved  on 25 May 2006 on the Turin-Novara line.
 ETR 500 Y1 achieved  on the Milan-Bologna line on 1 March 2008 at 17:23.
This represents the "indoors" world speed record, as the speed was reached in the Monte Bibele tunnel on the new high speed line between Bologna and Florence.

By the end of 2017 Trenitalia will have 50 new ETR 1000 able to reach .

See also

ElettroTreno
Eurostar Italia
High-speed rail in Italy
List of high speed trains
New Pendolino
Pendolino
Rete Ferroviaria Italiana
Trenitalia

Footnotes

References
Der italienische Hochgeschwindigkeitszug ETR 500 (1. Auslieferung).Hochgeschwindigkeitszüge.com (German)
Der italienische Hochgeschwindigkeitszug ETR 500 (2. Serie).Hochgeschwindigkeitszüge.com (German)

External links

FS ETR 500 P96 @ Trainspo
European Railway Picture Gallery

High-speed trains of Italy
Bombardier Transportation multiple units
AnsaldoBreda multiple units
Alstom multiple units
ETR 500
Passenger trains running at least at 300 km/h in commercial operations
Passenger trains running at least at 250 km/h in commercial operations
Passenger trains running at least at 200 km/h in commercial operations
Italian streamliner trains
Train-related introductions in 1993
Electric multiple units with locomotive-like power cars
3000 V DC multiple units
25 kV AC multiple units
1500 V DC multiple units of France